Pollokshields East railway station is one of three railway stations serving Pollokshields in Glasgow, Scotland. The station is managed by ScotRail and lies on the Cathcart Circle Line.

History 
The station opened concurrently with the Cathcart District Railway, on 1 March 1886 and was the first of two stations on the Cathcart Circle serving the area to be built (nearby  opened eight years later on the western side of the Circle).  It was closed as a wartime economy measure during World War 1 between January 1917 and June 1919.  The 1923 Grouping saw ownership pass to the London, Midland and Scottish Railway and then onto the Scottish Region of British Railways in January 1948.  Many trains over the route began to be worked by diesel multiple units from the summer of 1958, with overhead electrification following in 1962.  A line voltage of 6.25 kV A.C was used south of there initially due to clearance issues with the bridges & cuttings along the route, though this was subsequently increased to the standard 25 kV in the early 1970s.

The original station building was badly damaged by fire in April 1976 and was subsequently rebuilt in contemporary style by British Rail.

Services

2016 
A Sunday service is almost the same except the Cathcart Circle trains do not operate. As a result, only three trains per hour operate to Glasgow Central.

Routes

See also
 Pollokshields railway station
 Pollokshields West railway station

References

Sources 
 

 
 
 

Railway stations in Glasgow
Former Caledonian Railway stations
Railway stations in Great Britain opened in 1886
Railway stations in Great Britain closed in 1917
Railway stations in Great Britain opened in 1919
SPT railway stations
Railway stations served by ScotRail
Pollokshields